Albert Meyong Zé (born 19 October 1980), known as Meyong, is a Cameroonian former footballer who played as a striker, currently a manager.

He spent most of his professional career in Portugal, amassing Primeira Liga totals of 231 matches and 79 goals over 13 seasons and representing mainly in the competition Vitória de Setúbal (seven years) and Braga (three and a half).

Meyong appeared with Cameroon at the 2006 Africa Cup of Nations.

Club career
Born in Yaoundé, Meyong started playing in Europe still a youngster, for Italian club Ravenna Calcio. After one and a half seasons he moved to Portuguese Primeira Liga side Vitória Futebol Clube; he won the Taça de Portugal in 2005, having scored the winning goal in the final against S.L. Benfica.

In the summer of 2005, Meyong signed a two-year contract with C.F. Os Belenenses – where he was the league's top scorer despite the club's bottom-four finish– moving to Levante UD a year later. Due to late payment of salary he was loaned to Albacete Balompié, after one appearance for Levante in 2007–08.

Meyong returned to Portugal and Belenenses in January 2008, netting the penalty winner against Associação Naval 1º de Maio in a 2–1 home win but, being this the third team he represented in the season, which went against FIFA regulations, his registration was deemed illegal and Belenenses condemned to lose six points in the table (awarded 0–3 loss and three-point penalty in this match). This led to fans of the latter assaulting director of football Carlos Janela before the decision was taken, with him also being immediately sacked.

In August 2008, Meyong joined S.C. Braga of the same league. He scored his first goal for his new team on the 23rd, in a 2–0 defeat of F.C. Paços de Ferreira. He added a hat-trick on 18 September in a UEFA Cup first-round tie against Artmedia Bratislava, a 4–0 home victory. Midway through 2008–09 he agreed to a new one-year deal, running until June 2011.

In 2009–10, Meyong was an essential attacking unit for Braga, scoring 11 league goals as the Minho club finished in the second position, a best-ever. During the campaign, for example, he found the net against Sporting CP (2–1 away win), adding two late penalties against neighbours Vitória de Guimarães (3–2, at home).

In late December 2011, Meyong was released by Braga after very little playing time in his last two seasons, along with Rodrigo Galo, Marcos and Fran Mérida. After being linked to C.D. Nacional and C.D. Feirense he eventually returned to Setúbal and Vitória, after nearly seven years.

Meyong led the national scoring charts midway through the 2012–13 season, alongside FC Porto's Jackson Martínez and Benfica's Óscar Cardozo; highlights included three goals against Rio Ave FC (but in a 3–5 home defeat) and Moreirense FC (5–0, home). In early January 2013, however, he moved to Luanda-based Kabuscorp S.C. in Angola.

After retiring at the age of 36, Meyong joined Vitória de Setúbal's coaching staff as an assistant. On 28 October 2019, after Sandro Mendes' dismissal, he was named caretaker, and held this post again next July between the resignation of Julio Velázquez and appointment of Lito Vidigal; his managerial debut was on 31 October, in a 1–1 draw at C.D. Santa Clara.

Meyong briefly came out of retirement aged 40, appearing for amateurs União Futebol Comércio e Indústria after an invitation from his friend João Tavira who was their vice-president.

International career
Meyong played for the Cameroon national team over five years, his debut coming in 2004. He also represented his country at the 2000 Summer Olympics, where he won a gold medal.

Meyong was picked for the squad that appeared at the 2006 Africa Cup of Nations: manager Artur Jorge started him alongside FC Barcelona's Samuel Eto'o during the tournament and he scored two goals, one in the group stage against Togo and another in the quarter-finals against Ivory Coast as the Lions Indomptables exited after losing on penalties 11–12.

Career statistics

Club

International goals

Honours
Vitória Setúbal
Taça de Portugal: 2004–05

Braga
UEFA Intertoto Cup: 2008
UEFA Europa League runner-up: 2010–11

Kabuscorp
Girabola: 2013
Supertaça de Angola: 2014

Cameroon
Summer Olympic Games: 2000

Individual
Primeira Liga top scorer: 2005–06 (17 goals)
Taça de Portugal top scorer: 2004–05 (4 goals)
Girabola top scorer: 2013 (20 goals), 2014 (17 goals), 2015 (13 goals)

References

External links

1980 births
Living people
Footballers from Yaoundé
Cameroonian footballers
Association football forwards
Canon Yaoundé players
Serie B players
Ravenna F.C. players
Primeira Liga players
Liga Portugal 2 players
Vitória F.C. players
C.F. Os Belenenses players
S.C. Braga players
La Liga players
Segunda División players
Levante UD footballers
Albacete Balompié players
Girabola players
Kabuscorp S.C.P. players
Cameroon international footballers
2006 Africa Cup of Nations players
Footballers at the 2000 Summer Olympics
Olympic footballers of Cameroon
Medalists at the 2000 Summer Olympics
Olympic medalists in football
Olympic gold medalists for Cameroon
Cameroonian expatriate footballers
Expatriate footballers in Italy
Expatriate footballers in Portugal
Expatriate footballers in Spain
Expatriate footballers in Angola
Cameroonian expatriate sportspeople in Italy
Cameroonian expatriate sportspeople in Portugal
Cameroonian expatriate sportspeople in Spain
Cameroonian expatriate sportspeople in Angola
Cameroonian football managers
Primeira Liga managers
Vitória F.C. managers
Cameroonian expatriate football managers
Expatriate football managers in Portugal